Porsche has made a number of V8 gasoline engines over the last 40 years; ever since their first V8 engine debuted in the Porsche 928, in 1977.

Background
Porsche's V8 engine is currently in its fourth consecutive generation. July 8, 2016, marked the 40-year anniversary since their first engine rolled off the production line, in the 928. Under the hood was an engine that had never been used before; an eight-cylinder engine with a 90° V-angle, and water-cooling.

1977: First Generation
Porsche began a fresh chapter in engine building with the V-engine: The eight-cylinder engine was made up of essentially all lightweight alloys. As is characteristic with Porsche, it started a new era of engine construction. This was the first time in Europe that an engine was leaving the assembly line whose cylinder linings were engraved from cast aluminum. The 4.5-liter engine had a noticeably low compression ratio of 8.5:1. This meant it would be able to use normal 91-octane gasoline without any problems, which was extremely crucial to Porsche. However, this also restricted power rating, which was still at the more economical end of the range of possibilities. Their eight-cylinder engine made 176 kW (240 hp) at a moderate 5,500 rpm, which was sufficient for a top speed of 230 km/h. The engine’s nominal torque was 350 Nm at 3,600 rpm.

Progressively, Porsche engineers leveraged the potential within the eight-cylinder engine. The 928 S debuted at the 1979 IAA car show. Its engine had bores that were two millimeters larger, which meant an engine displacement of 4.7 liters. Its compression ratio increased to 10.0:1, which required the use of super gasoline. Nonetheless, the powerplant sparkled with a large power boost to 221 kW (300 hp). This allowed the 928 S to break the 250 km/h speed barrier. Later, another increase of the compression ratio and a switch over to electronic fuel injection made another improvement in power to 228 kW (310 hp).

1986: Catalytic Converters and four-valves per cylinder
Porsche engineers presented their next trump in 1986. Over the course of introducing catalytic converter technology, including in Europe, the eight-cylinder engine received its most substantial redesign. The new CAT version had completely redesigned cylinder heads with four valves per combustion chamber and two camshafts per cylinder bank. Increasing the bore to 100 mm increased engine size to about five liters. The eight-cylinder engine with emissions control began with 212 kW (288 hp). Its power limit was set by its low compression ratio, because initially, only standard unleaded gasoline was available in Europe. This barrier fell in 1987 with the introduction of the 928 S4, whose five-liter engine was created for super gasoline, now producing 235 kW (320 hp). After two years, a GT variant was built, which created 243 kW (330 hp), thanks to sharper valve timing control. Manufacturing of the 928 model line ended in 1995, and this also denoted the end of the first era of eight-cylinder V-engines from Porsche.

2002: Second Generation

Seven years later, after production ended for the first generation engine, a third Porsche model line with a redesigned eight-cylinder engine caused quite a response. The sports car manufacturer had started on the new Cayenne SUV. The new engine line, with its entirely new design, constituted two engines. The 4.5-liter naturally-aspirated engine in the Cayenne S already produced 250 kW (340 hp). The new top-of-the-line eight-cylinder was an engine in its own class, with twin-turbocharging, and 331 kW (450 hp) of power from the same base engine. It catapulted the Cayenne Turbo into the highest class of the quickest SUVs of its time. 

Three years after the turbocharged eight-cylinder engine made its debut, Porsche went to work to develop it into the engine of the Cayenne Turbo S. 383 kilowatts or 521 hp at 5,500 rpm – this made the new SUV the second most powerful production Porsche car ever built; behind the Carrera GT sports car.

2007: Gasoline Direct Injection
In 2007, Porsche introduced an updated and reworked Cayenne model line-up, whose engines were switched over to gasoline direct injection. To increase power, bores that were three millimeters larger raised engine displacement to 4.8 liters. The Cayenne Turbo also received new turbochargers with larger radial turbines. Afterward, the eight-cylinder engine in the Cayenne S had an output of 283 kW (385 hp). The turbo engine now made 368 kW (500 hp) of power. The start of direct fuel injection was a key part in decreasing fuel consumption figures of the Cayenne models in the New European Driving Cycle (NEDC) by an average of eight percent.

2009: Panamera
In 2009, Porsche presented the Panamera as its fourth model line, and with the Gran Turismo, two more development stages of the eight-cylinder engines. The adjusted exhaust system and optimized engine control of the naturally-aspirated engine produced 294 kW (400 hp) of boosted power and a nominal torque of 500 Nm. In the Panamera Turbo, the 4.8-liter V8 twin-turbo engine provided 368 kW (500 hp) and a maximum torque of 700 Nm. The extensive use of lightweight alloys and design improvements also decreased engine mass by several kilograms. Less than 12 months later, these engines were introduced into the Cayenne models as well.

Porsche produced even higher-powered versions for the exceptionally sports models of the Panamera and Cayenne. The eight-cylinder naturally-aspirated engine elevated the power of the Panamera GTS to 316 kW (430 hp), and in the Cayenne GTS to 309 kW (420 hp). The turbocharged engine in the Cayenne Turbo raised engine output to 382 kW (520 hp), in the Panamera Turbo S to 405 kW (550 hp), and in the Cayenne Turbo S in several stages up to 419 kW (570 hp).

2013: Third Generation
When the third, completely re-developed V-8 from Porsche went into production in 2013, it wasn’t the engine itself that was the primary focus of attention, rather it was its counterpart: the electric drive. The 918 Spyder was the first super sports car to implement a hybrid drive system.
Its primary source of power was a detuned racing engine; similar to the Carrera GT's engine. At 132 hp/liter displacement, it had the world’s highest specific power of a street-legal naturally-aspirated engine, and at the same time, it was the lightest production naturally-aspirated V-8 engine, weighing only 135 kilograms. Rotating inside the eight-cylinder engine with its normal 90-degree cylinder bank angle, was a flat-plane crankshaft with 180-degree offset crank throws for the connecting rods.

Direct fuel injection
The MR6 engine was designed completely in-house by Porsche engineers with help from Penske Racing. The 3.4-litre 90-degree V8 racing engine was designed from scratch; and drove the rear wheels through a six-speed electro-pneumatic sequential gearbox. Since its introduction in 2005 the engine, which initially produced  has been developed and modified to meet the changing regulations of both the ALMS and the ACO.

 
The 4.6-liter engine was derived directly from the engine of the successful RS Spyder. It outputted 447 kW (608 hp) at 8,700 rpm. Porsche engineers created direct fuel injection with centrally located solenoid injectors – an especially efficient and low-emission combustion process. These injectors send fuel into the combustion chambers at pressures up to 200 bar through seven holes each. Extensive lightweight design measures meant such features as titanium connecting rods and thin-walled low-pressure castings of the crankcase and the cylinder heads.

The eight-cylinder V-engine emotionalized the 918 Spyder by its performance abilities and by its sound. In addition to the ignition sequence, this is attributable first and foremost to what is known as the “top pipes”: the tailpipes stop at the upper part of the rear end right above the engine. No other production vehicle used this solution. The top pipes’ greatest technical advantage is optimal heat rejection, since hot gases are exhausted via the shortest possible path, and exhaust gas back pressure remains low.

This type of HSI engine design, where HSI means “hot side inside,” the 918 engine created a solid foundation for the new eight-cylinder engine of the Panamera. It contains the spirit of forty years of V-8 engines from Porsche.

Applications

Road cars
Porsche 928
Porsche Cayenne
Porsche Panamera
Porsche 918

Race Cars
Porsche RS Spyder
Porsche 963

References

Engines by model
Gasoline engines by model
Porsche
V8 engines
Porsche in motorsport